This was the sixth edition of Los Premios 40 Principales, created by Los 40 Principales to honor the best in Spanish and international music. It was also the last to feature the national American categories, since Los Premios 40 Principales América would be created for 2012.

Performers

Awards

Best Song
Juan Magan (featuring Pitbull and El Cata) — "Bailando Por Ahí"
Enrique Iglesias (featuring Ludacris and DJ Frank E) — "Tonight (I'm Lovin' You)"
La Musicalité — "4 Elementos"
Carlos Jean — "Lead the Way"
Malú — "Blanco y Negro"

Best Video
Enrique Iglesias (featuring Ludacris and DJ Frank E) — "Tonight (I'm Lovin' You)"
Ragdog — "Tu y Yo"
Huecco — "Dame Vida"
Virginia Labuat — "The Time is Now"
Pignoise — "Cama Vacía"

Best Album
Dani Martín — Pequeño
Melendi — Volvamos a Empezar
Maldita Nerea — Fácil
Pablo Alborán — Pablo Alborán
La Oreja de Van Gogh — Cometas por el cielo

Best Act
Enrique Iglesias
Dani Martín
El Pescao
Maldita Nerea
La Oreja de Van Gogh

Best New Act
Labuat
Juan Magan
Pablo Alborán
The Monomes
Carlos Jean

Best Tour
Maldita Nerea — Gira Fácil
El Pescao — Tour Nada-Lógico
Dani Martín — Gira Pequeño
Maná — Tour Drama y Luz
Melendi — Gira Volvamos a Empezar

Best Dance Act
Enrique Iglesias (featuring Ludacris and DJ Frank E) — "Tonight (I'm Lovin' You)"
Juan Magan (featuring Pitbull and El Cata) — "Bailando Por El Mundo"
Marta Sánchez (featuring D-Mol) — "Get Together"
Carlos Jean (featuring Electric Nana) — "Lead the Way"
Dani Moreno (featuring Jackie Sagana) — "Domino"

Best Argentine Act
Miranda!
Axel
Dread Mar I
Tan Biónica
El Original

Best Chilean Act
Mc Billeta
Eyci and Cody
Francisca Valenzuela
Los Vásquez
Los Bunkers

Best Colombian Act
J Balvin
Pasabordo
Jiggy Dramma
Cali & El Dandee
The Mills

Best Costa Rican Act
Los Govinda
Garbanzos
Los Ajenos
Akasha
Cocofunka

Best Ecuadorian Act
Daniel Betancourth
Karla Kanora
Daniel Páez
Brito
Papá Chango

Best Guatemalan Act
Daniela Carpio
Malacates Trébol Shop
Gaby Moreno
El Tambor de la Tribu
Los Reyes Vagos

Best Mexican Act
Paty Cantú
Belanova
Maná
Ximena Sariñana
Zoé

Best Panamanian Act
Los Rabanes
Os Almirantes
Aldo Ranks
RD Maravilla
Joey Montana

Best Latin Song
Shakira — "Loca"
Shakira — "Rabiosa"
Don Omar (featuring Lucenzo) — "Danza Kuduro"
Carlos Baute — "Quién te Quiere Como Yo"
Maná — "Lluvia al Corazón"

Best Latin Act
Maná
Don Omar
Carlos Baute
Shakira
Ricky Martin

Best International Song
Jennifer Lopez (featuring Pitbull) — "On the Floor"
Pitbull (featuring Ne-Yo, Afrojack, and Nayer) — "Give Me Everything"
Rihanna — "S&M"
LMFAO — "Party Rock Anthem"
Alexandra Stan — "Mr. Saxobeat"

Best International Act
Rihanna
Pitbull
Katy Perry
Britney Spears
Bruno Mars

Presenters
Patricia Montero and Adrián Lastra — presented Best New Act
Cristina Boscá — introduced Alexandra Stan
Manu Carreño and Ponseti — presented Best Guatemalan Act and Best International Act
Laura Esquivel and Jaime Olías — presented Best Argentine Act and Best Video
Frank Blanco — introduced Amaia Montero
Iván Massagué and Javier Hernández — presented Best Costa Rican Act
María Adánez and Jesús Olmedo — presented Best Latin Act
Tito Rabat and Axel Pons — presented Best Chilean Act and Best International Song
Rubén Ochandiano and Óscar "Machupichu" Reyes — presented Best Tour and Best Ecuadorian Act
Alexandra Jiménez and Tania Llasera — presented Best Latin Song
Antonio Velázquez and Nerea Garmendia — presented Best Guatemalan Act
Úrsula Corberó and Luis Fernández — presented Best Colombian Act and Best Dance Act
Berta Collado and Jaime Cantizano — presented Best Mexican Act and Best Act
Fonsi Nieto and Chenoa — presented Best Album
Antonio Orozco and Manuel Carrasco — presented Best Song

2011 music awards
Los Premios 40 Principales
2011 in Spanish music